The Dr. Tarbell House, located at 304 Second Ave. SE in Watertown, South Dakota, was built in 1904.  It was listed on the National Register of Historic Places in 2001.

It is a Colonial Revival style house with a hipped roof, on a stone foundation.  Its front, north-facing facade has a two-story cantered bay window topped by a pediment.

References

Houses on the National Register of Historic Places in South Dakota
Colonial Revival architecture in South Dakota
Houses completed in 1904
Codington County, South Dakota